Ebenezer Gilbert Nii Narh Nartey is a Ghanaian politician and member of the Seventh Parliament of the Fourth Republic of Ghana representing the Ablekuma Central Constituency in the Greater Accra Region on the ticket of the New Patriotic Party.

Early life and education 
He hails from Ningo in the Greater Accra Region.

He holds a Diploma in Human Resource Management from the Institute of Commercial Management. A Diploma in Architectural Draftsmanship from the Kwame Nkrumah University of Science and Technology and NVTI Certificate from the Modern School of Draftsmanship.

Politics 
He is a member of the New Patriotic party. He is the Member of Parliament for Ablekuma Central Constituency in the Greater Accra Region.

Employment 
He taught at Islamic Education Programme from 2004 to 2005. He was also the Executive Secretary for Hands that Care NGO. He was the Deputy Clients Service Manager from 2007 to 2011 at Lands Commission and the managing director of Ednark Limited from 2011 to 2016.

Religion 
He is a Christian.

References

Ghanaian MPs 2017–2021
Living people
1979 births
New Patriotic Party politicians